Simalio is a genus of sac spiders first described by Eugène Simon in 1897.

Species
 it contains eight species from Sri Lanka and India to southeast Asia, with one species restricted to Trinidad:
Simalio aurobindoi Patel & Reddy, 1991 – India
Simalio biswasi Majumder & Tikader, 1991 – India
Simalio castaneiceps Simon, 1906 – India
Simalio lucorum Simon, 1906 – Sri Lanka
Simalio percomis Simon, 1906 – India
Simalio petilus Simon, 1897 (type) – Philippines
Simalio phaeocephalus Simon, 1906 – Sri Lanka
Simalio rubidus Simon, 1897 – Trinidad

References

Araneomorphae genera
Clubionidae
Spiders of Asia
Spiders of the Caribbean
Taxa named by Eugène Simon